Modestia Aparte is a Spanish pop music band that recorded albums from 1988 to 2008.

Background 
Modestia Aparte began recording Spanish-language pop albums in 1988. Their biggest hit was "Chirimoya" (from their first album, The Shape (Por Amor al Arte)), where they mimicked voices from the cartoons Pixie & Dixie, Tweety, and Roadrunner. The band broke up in 1994.

In 2002, two members performed a live concert, from which the live album, Modesty Aside Live 17 Greatest Hits (Modestia Aparte Vivo 17 Grandes Exitos) was recorded. Two years later, they released an album with new songs entitled, This must be love (Esto debe Ser Amor). In 2005, they organised a compilation tribute album, recording with other well-known pop groups. 

In 2008, original band member Fernando López revived the band, without the involvement of other original members. The new formation released an album entitled, Twenty, in recognition of their 20 years performing together in the band. This was their last album.

Band members 
 Fernando López: vocals and guitar
 Javier Portugués: vocals and drums
 Luis Lage: saxophone
 Carlos Palma: bass guitar
 Ignacio Quijano: piano

Discography 
 The Shape (Por Amor al Arte) (1988)
 Things of Age (Cosas de la Edad) (1990)
 Stand Up (Levántate) (1991)
 Stories No Importance (Historias Sin Importancia) (1991)
 The Line of Life (La Línea de la Vida) (1992)
 Modesty (Modestia Aparte) (1993)
 Modest... Until Forever (Modestamente... Hasta Siempre) (1994)
 Modesty Aside Live 17 Greatest Hits (Modestia Aparte Vivo 17 Grandes Exitos) (2002)
 This Must Be Love (Esto debe Ser Amor) (2004)
 Modesty Aside and Friends – Disco Tribute (Modestia Aparte Y Amigos – Disco Homenaje) (2005)
 Twenty (Veinte) (2008)

References

External links 
 http://www.last.fm/music/Modestia+Aparte
 http://www.discogs.com/artist/Modestia+Aparte/-Appearances/-Albums?anv=&noanv=

Spanish pop music groups
Musical groups established in 1988
Musical groups disestablished in 1994
Musical groups reestablished in 2002